The 2020 Norwegian Indoor Athletics Championships was the year's national indoor track and field championships for Norway. It was held on 1 and 2 February at the Bærum Idrettspark in Bærum.  It was organised by Oslo og Akershus Friidrettskrets.

Results

Men

Women

Referanser

External links 
 Official website

Norwegian Indoor Athletics Championships
Norwegian Athletics Championships
Norwegian Athletics Championships
Norwegian Athletics Championships
Sport in Bærum